Dance with Me is an album by Jimmy Sturr and His Orchestra, released on August 18, 1998. In 1999, the album won Sturr the Grammy Award for Best Polka Album. Dance with Me was Sturr's 100th album.

Critical reception
AllMusic wrote that the album "is a very good recording and should be enjoyed by those who enjoy first-rate dance music and can leap beyond the stereotype of polka music being only for the gray-haired generation."

Track listing
 "Make Mine Polka" (feat. The Oak Ridge Boys)
 "My Polka Dot" (feat. The Jordanaires)
 "Stellato's Polka"
 "May All Your Dreams Come True" (feat. The Oak Ridge Boys)
 "Papa Won't You Dance With Me" (feat. The Rocco Sisters)
 "E-String Polka"
 "Borracho #1"
 "Ordinary Girl" (feat. The Oak Ridge Boys)
 "Blue Star"
 "In One Year (Za Rok)"
 "Watch Your Step"
 "Loretta" (feat. The Oak Ridge Boys)
 "Wasn't That a Party" (feat. The Oak Ridge Boys)

Track listing adapted from the Apple Store

See also
 Polka in the United States

References

1998 albums
Grammy Award for Best Polka Album
Jimmy Sturr albums